Blinkenlights may refer to:

Blinkenlights, a joke hacker term
Project Blinkenlights